Kilo is a station on the VR commuter rail network on the Rantarata line located in Kilo, a district of the city of Espoo in Finland.

History
Kilo station has had three station buildings. The first was merely a small wood-heated cabin. The second was a larger wooden building and also included the white house of the track guardian, which still stands between the Kilo and Kera stations. This larger building was torn down in the early 1980s and replaced by a smaller sheet-metal building that served as the station's third station building. This latter building, which had been used as a kiosk since VR stopped selling tickets in Kilo at the beginning of the 2000s, has now been moved to a field across Lansanpurontie from the train station.

In the 1980s, there was a small factory south of the tracks, right next to the station, but it was torn down, and many low-rise apartment buildings have been built in its place. The level crossing to the west of the station was removed in the middle of the 1990s and replaced by a tunnel east of the station.

Bus connections
 114 (Leppävaara Station-Tapiola) 
 114N (Leppävaara Station-Kamppi, nighttime) 
 225K (Leppävaara-Kilo-Viherlaakso-Hognäs)

References 

Railway stations in Espoo